The Norrland Signal Battalion, designated Signbat/I 19, originally Norrland Signal Corps, designated S 3, was a Swedish Army signal unit, one of the few new formations raised in the 20th century. It was disbanded in 2005. The unit was garrisoned in Norrbotten.

History 
The unit has its origins in a 1915 detached company, Field Telegraph Corps' Detachment in Boden, of the Field Telegraph Corps that was garrisoned in Boden. The company gained the designation Ing 3 det (3rd Engineer Regiment, detachment). The detachment was incorporated into Boden Engineer Corps in 1925, but was split off and formed Boden Signal Company with designation S 1 B in 1937.

The company was in 1954 upgraded to a separate battalion, and gained the designation S 3 (3rd Signal Regiment) in 1955. The battalion was renamed Norrland Signal Battalion soon after, and was upgraded to a regiment with the name Norrland Signal Regiment in 1987 but downgraded to a battalion-size unit again in 1994. In 2000, the battalion became one of five battalions in Norrbotten Regiment, regaining its old name, but not the designation S 3 it originally had, even though it was still in common use. The battalion was disbanded in 2005.

Campaigns 
None

Organisation 
?

Heraldry and traditions

Colours, standards and guidons
The unit presents one colour. It was presented to the then Royal Norrland Signals Battalion (S 3) in Boden by His Majesty the King Gustaf VI Adolf on 28 July 1961. It was used as regimental colour by S 3 until 1 July 2000. The colour may be used according to the decisions of CO I 19. The colour is drawn by Brita Grep and embroidered by hand in insertion technique by the company Libraria. Blazon: "On blue cloth in the centre the lesser coat of arms of Sweden, three yellow crowns placed two and one. In the first corner a mullet with a cluster of rays, all yellow. In the lower part of this placed upon a cluster of yellow bolts, the provincial coat of arms of Västerbotten; azure powdered with estoiles or, a reindeer at speed argent armed and langued gules. The shield ensigned with a royal crown proper."

Coat of arms
The coat of the arms of the Norrland Signal Battalion (S 3) 1977–1987, the Norrland Signal Regiment (S 3) 1987–1994, the Norrland Signal Corps (S 3) 1994–2000 and the Norrland Signal Battalion (Signbat/I 19) 2000–2004. Blazon: "Azure, powdered with estoiles or, the provincial badge of Västerbotten, a reindeer courant argent, armed and langued gules. The shield surmounted a cluster of bolts, or".

Medals
In 1998, the Norrlands signalkårs förtjänstmedalj ("Norrland Signals Corps Medal of Merit") in silver (NorrlsignkSM) of the 8th size was established. This medal was from 2000 to 2004 named Norrlands signalbataljons (S 3) förtjänstmedalj ("Norrland Signals Battalion (S 3) Medal of Merit") (NorrlsignbatSM). The medal ribbon is of green moiré with a blue stripe on the middle followed on both sides by a yellow stripe.

In 2005, the Norrlands signalbataljons minnesmedalj ("Norrland Signals Battalion Commemorative Medal") in silver (NorrlsignbatMSM) of the 8th size was established. The medal ribbon is divided in blue, green, yellow, pale blue, yellow, green and blue moiré.

Commanding officers
From 1954 to 1987 the commanding officer was called battalion commander and from 1987 to 1994 he was called regimental commander and from 1994 to 2000 he was called corps commander. From 2000 to 2004, the unit was an integral part of Norrbotten Regiment.

1954–1956: Gunnar Olof Friberg
1956–1960: Tage Ingemar Bratt
1960–1964: Nils Fredrik Schale
1964–1966: Karl Edvin Eriksson
1966–1971: Arne Risling
1971–1977: Kjell T:son Nerpin
1977–1979: Bror Oscar Nyström
1979–1980: Åke Bertil Gunnar Lövdahl
1981–1982: Bo Jonas Forsgren
1982–1987: Carl-Henrik Bengsston
1987–1987: Carl-Henrik Bengsston
1987–1990: Lennart Johansson
1990–1992: Hasse Kvint
1992–1996: Ulf Nordlander
1996–2000: Ola Hanson
2000–2001: Mats Blom
2001–2002: Dennis Gyllensporre
2002–2003: Anders Magnusson
2003–2004: Anders Josefsson
2004–2005: Dan Hagman

Names, designations and locations

See also
List of Swedish signal regiments

Footnotes

References

Notes

Print

Further reading

Military communications units and formations of the Swedish Army
Battalions of the Swedish Army
Disbanded units and formations of Sweden
Military units and formations established in 1954
Military units and formations established in 2004
1954 establishments in Sweden
2004 disestablishments in Sweden
Boden Garrison